Christian Michelides (born July 19, 1957) is an Austrian psychotherapist. He is the director of Lighthouse Wien.

Life and career
Michelides was born in Graz. In 1973, he started to work as an opera critic of a provincial newspaper called Südost Tagespost. After serving as an assistant director for plays of Eugène Ionesco and Thomas Bernhard in 1975 at Austria's National Theater, the Burgtheater, he achieved his high school diploma in 1978. Thereafter he studied arts, philosophy and history of theatre, as well as directing in Milan, Vienna and New York, while still publishing articles in Austrian and Italian journals.

In the 1980s, Michelides was a collaborator for the newly founded magazine WIENER; he then joined the ad agency GGK Wien and the marketing team of the Swiss watch Swatch in Biel. At the same time, he organized a series of exhibitions in Vienna and published some catalogues. He presented five young American photographic artists (John Dugdale, Marcus Leatherdale, Robert Mapplethorpe, Todd Watts and Joel-Peter Witkin) for the first time in Europe.

In the early 1990s, he served as an investigative journalist for the magazine FORVM and other publications in Austria and Germany. Michelides disclosed the membership of Thomas Bernhard in a conservative party organization called the Bauernbund; he also revealed that Rudolf Augstein had published in the Nazi paper Völkischer Beobachter. Finally he exposed Gertrud Fussenegger, Austria's then most prominent female author, as a former avid Hitler worshipper. Michelides also discovered that the Austrian Academy of Sciences had secretly stopped awarding the Franz-Grillparzer-Preis, a prize for dramatists left in trust for that purpose by Austrian national poet Franz Grillparzer. Furthermore, he researched and documented the expansionistic endeavours of großdeutsch-orientated Alfred Toepfer and his close ties to Joseph Goebbels.

As of 1994, Michelides changed his focus to human rights activism and the defence of minorities. In June 1995 he founded the first International Human Rights Tribunal in Vienna. The tribunal was chaired by human rights activists Freda Meissner-Blau and Gerhard Oberschlick; in this tribunal, Michelides acted as the attorney general. The theme of the tribunal was the discrimination and persecution of lesbians, gays, bisexuals and transgender-persons in Austria during the period from 1945 to 1995.

Michelides was the founder of the initiative "Häfn human" that counselled and visited prison inmates; he fought against discrimination of people with HIV and AIDS and participated in grassroots organisations such as Club Plus, Selfhelp Vienna and Social Work from Underneath. From 1995 to 1997, Michelides chaired the Austrian Lesbian and Gay Forum (ÖLSF) and instigated Austria's first LGBT parade, called  (rainbow parade). In 1998 he started his social work for the homeless.

In 2000, Michelides founded Lighthouse Wien, a shelter for homeless drug addicts with severe traumas, many of them HIV-positive. In 2002, he graduated as a sex and mental health counselor. Since 2009 Michelides has conducted a psychoanalytic men's group. He now also works as a group analyst in private practice.

Publications
 (ed.) Wiener Blut '83: Eine Gesellschaftskomödie mit Paten und Kindern. Vienna 1983.
 (ed.) Marcus Leatherdale. With texts by Kathy Acker and Christian Michelides. Molotov, Vienna 1983.
 (ed.) Fotografie '83. Austria's first photography art fair. Vienna 1983.
 (ed.) Lothar Rübelt: Das Geheimnis des Moments. [The Secret of the Moment], exhibition at Albertina, Vienna 1985
 (ed.) Memorandum über die Stiftungen des Alfred C. Toepfer und deren Zusammenarbeit mit der Universität Wien. Vienna 1991, 3rd edition

References

External links

 
 Publications in the Austrian National Library
 Publications in FORVM

 Praxis Löwengasse, website of the institution

1957 births
Living people
People from Graz in health professions
20th-century Austrian people
21st-century Austrian people
Political activists
Austrian human rights activists
Austrian people of Greek descent
Psychotherapists